Joaquín Loyzaga Sr. (born Joaquín Loyzaga y Martínez; July 12, 1890 – July 4, 1935) was a Filipino international footballer who has played in the Far Eastern Championship Games, the precursor of the Asian Games.

Loyzaga has played for the Philippines national football team in three editions of the Far Eastern Championship Games from 1913 to 1917. In the 1917 Games, he helped the national team won 15–2 over Japan.

He was married to Carmen Matute and is the father of Carlos Loyzaga who is best known as a basketball player. The younger Loyzaga was initially involved in football.

At the inaugural Manila Youth Games in 2002, plagues of recognition of select athletes from Manila, including Loyzaga, were presented.

References

Filipino footballers
Philippines international footballers
Date of death missing
Association footballers not categorized by position
Filipino people of Basque descent
1890 births